Paika Murmu was an Indian politician. He was elected to the Lok Sabha, lower house of the Parliament of India from Rajmahal, Bihar as a member of the Indian National Congress.

References

External links
 Official biographical sketch in Parliament of India website

Indian National Congress politicians
Santali people
India MPs 1957–1962
Lok Sabha members from Bihar
1912 births
Year of death missing